Pirro may refer to:

An Albanian given name; derived from Greek "Pyrrhos" (Latinized as "Pyrrhus") (flame-coloured, red-haired).

Pirro Çako (born 1965), Albanian artist
Pirro Del Balzo (c. 1430-1491), Italian nobleman
Pirro Dodbiba (1925–2004), Albanian politician
Pirro Gonzaga (1505–1529), Roman Catholic cardinal
Pirro Imperoli (1554–1617), Roman Catholic prelate
Pirro Kondi (born 1924), Albanian former politician
Pirro Vaso (born 1948), Albanian architect

As an Italian name, it is derived either from the aforementioned Greek name or from a variant of the name "Pierro" (from Peter).

Pirro or DiPirro originates from the name "di Pirro" or "DiPirro" meaning "of Pirro" or "family of Pirro". 

Pirro comes from the historical figure of Pyrrhus of Epirus (319/318 BC – 272 BC).

The Pirro family originated in ancient Greece and "Great Greece" or Magna Graecia, the name of the coastal areas of Southern Italy on the Tarentine Gulf that were extensively colonized by Greek settlers.

 André Pirro (1869–1943), French musicologist and organist
 Emanuele Pirro (born 1962), Italian race-car driver
 Jean Pirro (1813-1886), French linguist, inventor of the a posteriori universal language "Universalglot", published in 1868
 Jeanine Pirro (born 1951), American politician, attorney, TV personality, author, and former New York State judge and prosecutor
 John Pirro (died 2013), former lacrosse player and coach
 Loreta Pirro (born 1997), Albanian professional racing cyclist
 Mark Pirro (born 1970), American musician, audio engineer, and record producer
 Michele Pirro (born 1986), Italian motorcycle racer
 Nicholas J. Pirro (born 1940), American  politician
 Rocco Pirro (1916-1995), American football player and politician
 Ugo Pirro (1920-2008), Italian screenwriter and novelist
 Pirro Ligorio (died 1583), Italian artist

Pirro people, commonly called Yine people, an indigenous tribe in the Peruvian Amazon

See also 

 
 Piro (disambiguation)

Albanian masculine given names
Italian-language surnames